The 1280s is the decade starting January 1, 1280 and ending December 31, 1289.

Significant people

References